The Tomb of the Dancers or Tomb of the Dancing Women is a Peucetian tomb in Ruvo di Puglia, Italy. It was discovered in the Corso Cotugno necropolis in November 1833. The date of its construction is uncertain, dates ranging from the end of the fifth century BC to the mid-fourth century BC have been proposed. In any case, the tomb's frescoes are the oldest example of figurative painting in Apulia, together with another tomb in Gravina di Puglia. The Peucetians borrowed the practice of painting tombs from the Etruscans, who had an important influence on their culture. The tomb is named after the dancing women which appear on the frescoes in the tomb. The panels with the frescoes are now exhibited in the Naples National Archaeological Museum, inv. 9353.

Description 
The tomb has a semichamber design. Its six painted panels depict thirty or more dancing women, moving from left to right with arms interlocked as though they were dancing a circle around the interior of the tomb. They are dressed in chitons and cloaks and have brightly colored veils on their head. There are three men in the group, distinguished by their white clothes. One of them holds a lyre.

The skeletal remains of the deceased in the tomb clearly belonged to a distinguished male warrior. He was dressed in a helmet, greaves and shield. Next to his right arm were spears and daggers. The grave goods included different types of ceramic pottery. These consisted of kraters, amphorae, kantharoi and some oil lamps. They were arranged on the ground and hung from the lower sections of the walls. The pottery had symbolic and funerary significance.

See also

 Etruscan architecture
 Etruscan art
 Italic peoples
 Tomb of the Augurs
 Tomb of the Bulls
 Tomb of the Diver
 Tomb of the Leopards
 Tomb of the Triclinium

References

Sources

External links 

1833 archaeological discoveries
Ruvo di Puglia
Etruscan tombs